Chalk paint is a water-based, decorative paint invented by Annie Sloan which may be applied over almost any surface.  It requires very little preparation and needs a topcoat to avoid flaking. Chalk paints are also used by utility companies to mark road surfaces.

Description 
Chalk paint is a water-based, decorative paint that results in a chalky, matte finish. The paint consists of a fine powder such as plaster of Paris or calcium carbonate, mixed with water. Commercial acrylic paint is added as a colorant.

Origins
Artist Annie Sloan invented chalk paint in 1990 and registered chalk paint as a trademark. There are similar products on the retail market and many online recipes.

Uses

This paint is intended for use on furniture and other home décor to achieve a specific result, such as shabby chic, and vintage.  When applying chalk paint, an item's surface should be clean, and priming is only advised when working with a white chalk paint. It is also advised to use two  coats of lacquer to make sure the intended material for painting gets full coverage. Sanding or stripping previous layers is not needed. Interior and exterior surfaces including metal, wood, glass, concrete, plaster, and fabric, may be painted with chalk paint.

Chalk paint may be applied with a brush, roller, or spray gun. The paint should be applied in thin layers and will typically dry within two hours. A topcoat sealer, such as wax or lacquer be applied to avoid the flaking of the chalk paint. The topcoats may enhance the decorative characteristics.

Sprayable chalk paint is used by public works engineers to mark the location of utility pipes and cables on sidewalks, as an environmentally safe substance which can be easily removed when the work is complete. Others have used it to mark potholes in roads, and to spray graffiti that can be washed off.

References

Paints
Paint